"Poison" is a short story written by Roald Dahl that was originally published in June 1950 in Collier's. In 1950 it was adapted for the radio programme Escape. In 1958 it was turned into an episode of Alfred Hitchcock Presents, directed by Alfred Hitchcock himself. In 1980 it was adapted as the fifth episode of the second series of Tales of the Unexpected.

Plot summary
The story is set in India during the time of British rule. The main character is Harry Pope and the narrator of the story is Timber Woods. Timber goes over to his friend Harry Pope. Harry is in bed, motionless, sweating, and panicked. He explains that a venomous snake, the krait, has crawled onto his stomach, underneath the covers, and asks Timber to fetch a doctor. Timber calls Dr. Ganderbai, a local Indian doctor who rushes to help. Timber and Ganderbai frantically try to get the snake off of Harry through various methods (which include sedating the snake and giving Harry an antivenom). As the story progresses, it is revealed that there is in fact no snake on Harry.

After the initial panic, Ganderbai inquires whether Harry is certain that there actually was a snake. Harry, believing that Ganderbai is calling him a liar, berates the doctor with racial slurs. As Ganderbai walks out of the room, Timber thanks him and apologizes for Harry's behavior. Ganderbai's only reply is that the only thing Harry needs is a good vacation.

References

Short stories by Roald Dahl
1950 short stories
Works originally published in Collier's
Works about racism
Fictional snakes